Nová Bystrica is a village and municipality in Čadca District in the Žilina Region of northern Slovakia, in the Kysuce region.

History
In historical records the village was first mentioned in 1662.

Geography
The municipality lies at an altitude of 526 metres and covers an area of 125.261 km². It has a population of about 2855 people. It is located in the Bystrica river valley.

Tourism
In the local part Vychylovka, around 4 km further north-east, tourists can find some interesting attractions: the switchback railway, open-air museum of Kysuce village, established in 1974 primarily to save buildings from the now non-existing villages Riečnica and Harvelka, which were inundated by the Nová Bystrica reservoir, though it contains buildings from the other villages as well. It has also protected Vychylovka banks on the local Vychylovka stream and Vychylovka rocks.

References

External links
http://www.statistics.sk/mosmis/eng/run.html
Official website 

Villages and municipalities in Čadca District